Elkford Secondary is a public high school in Elkford, British Columbia part of School District 5 Southeast Kootenay.

School Reports - BC Ministry of Education
 Class Size
 Satisfaction Survey
 School Performance
 Skills Assessment
 Fraser Institute ranking

High schools in British Columbia
Educational institutions in Canada with year of establishment missing